is a former Japanese football player.

Playing career
Kumagai was born in Fujisawa on November 23, 1975. After graduating from Chuo University, he joined J1 League club Kashiwa Reysol in 1998. Although he debuted as defensive midfielder in 1999, he could hardly play in the match. In 2000, he moved to Regional Leagues club Sagawa Express Tokyo. He played as regular player and the club was promoted to Japan Football League (JFL) from 2001. He was selected Best Eleven in 2001 and 2002. In June 2005, he moved to Regional Leagues club Rosso Kumamoto (later Roasso Kumamoto). He played as regular player and the club was promoted to JFL in 2006 and J2 League in 2008. However he could hardly play in the match in 2008 and retired end of 2008 season.

Club statistics

References

External links

1975 births
Living people
Chuo University alumni
Association football people from Kanagawa Prefecture
Japanese footballers
J1 League players
J2 League players
Japan Football League players
Kashiwa Reysol players
Sagawa Shiga FC players
Roasso Kumamoto players
People from Fujisawa, Kanagawa
Association football midfielders